The 2019 Men's EuroHockey Junior Championship was the 19th edition of the men's EuroHockey Junior Championship, the biennial international men's under-21 field hockey championship of Europe organised by the European Hockey Federation. It was held alongside the women's tournament in Valencia, Spain from 15 to 21 July 2019.

This tournament served as the European qualifier for the 2021 FIH Junior World Cup, with the top six teams qualifying.

Germany won the tournament for the sixth time by defeating England 5–3 in the final. The defending champions, the Netherlands won the bronze model by defeating the hosts Spain 3–1.

Qualified teams
The following eighth team qualified based on their final positions in the 2017 EuroHockey Junior Championships.

Results
All times are local, CEST (UTC+2).

Preliminary round

Pool A

Pool B

Fifth to eighth place classification
The points obtained in the preliminary round against the other team are taken over.

Pool C

First to fourth place classification

Semi-finals

Third and fourth place

Final

Statistics

Final standings

 Qualified for the 2021 FIH Junior World Cup

 Relegated to the EuroHockey Junior Championship II

Goalscorers

See also
 2019 Men's EuroHockey Junior Championship II
 2019 Men's EuroHockey Nations Championship
 2019 Women's EuroHockey Junior Championship

References

EuroHockey Junior Championship
Junior 1
International field hockey competitions hosted by Spain
Sports competitions in Valencia
21st century in Valencia
EuroHockey Junior Championship
EuroHockey Championship
EuroHockey Junior Championship